This is a list of 126 species in the genus Malthodes.

Malthodes species

References